Yik-Man Wong (born 3 November 1990 in Tilburg) is a Dutch professional badminton player. She mainly participates in singles matches.

External links
http://bwfcontent.tournamentsoftware.com/profile/overview.aspx?id=93FBFC1E-CCA6-45AF-BBC4-B84C27BCF868

References

1990 births
Living people
Dutch female badminton players
Sportspeople from Tilburg
21st-century Dutch women